Roger Ramjet is a 1965–1969 American animated television series, starring Roger Ramjet and the American Eagle Squadron. The show was known for its simple animation, frenetic pace, and frequent references to pop culture which appealed to adults as well as children. The show aired on Cartoon Network from 1996 to 1998.

Plot
Roger Ramjet is a patriotic and highly moral — if not very bright — hero, who is typically out to save the world, with help from his Proton Energy Pills ("PEP"), which give him "the strength of twenty atom bombs for a period of twenty seconds". The world is invariably saved by defeating the various recurring criminals who populated the series.

On government missions assigned by General G.I. Brassbottom, Ramjet encounters various nemeses during his missions. Typically, he is caught, and must be rescued by his crew of sidekicks, the American Eagles: Yank, Doodle, Dan, and Dee (a play on "Yankee Doodle dandy," which also happens to be the tune to which the theme song is set). Although his Eagles appear to be children, each of them, except for Dee, flies his own individual ramjet aircraft expertly, and they are obviously much savvier than their leader.

The various recurring criminals include:
 Pint-sized gangster Noodles Romanoff and his evil organization N.A.S.T.Y. (National Association of Spies, Traitors and Yahoos, a contrived acronym). Noodles wears dark glasses, a fedora, and a trench coat. His hands are always jammed into his jacket pockets. His band of No Goods consist of several lookalike henchmen clad in hats and coats, who simultaneously utter incomprehensible phrases of agreement to whatever he says.
 The Solenoid Robots, green metal gas mask-faced evildoers from outer space who have a unicycle-like wheel instead of legs and talk in barely understandable electronic voices.
 Red Dog the Pirate, a redheaded short, squat scourge of the seven seas with an eye patch, peg-leg and a wiseacre parrot named Carl Bob for a sidekick.
 Jacqueline Hyde (a play on Jekyll and Hyde) is a blond, long-nosed, Zsa Zsa Gabor-accented foreign spy femme fatale, who aided by other spies and gangsters, tries to get information on plans, documents for her foreign government agency.
 Dr. Frank N. Schwine, a Boris Karloff soundalike mad scientist who, with the help of his purple propeller beanie-wearing assistant Sidney, keeps creating huge hulking Frankenstein-style monsters only to have them defeated by Roger and become football players.
 Count Batguy, a bald Nosferatu-style vampire from Transylvania complete with Bela Lugosi accent.
 Dr. What, internationally feared evil genius.
 Sexy senorita Tequila Mockingbird (a play on To Kill a Mockingbird) who teams up with her bandito boyfriends the Enchilada Brothers, Beef and Chicken, to stir up revolution in the tiny Latin American country of San Domino.

Another recurring, non-criminal character in the series was sportscaster Vincent Yafnarro, who appeared in several sports-related episodes.  Roger's tough little old mother, Ma Ramjet, appeared in several episodes; her voice was an imitation of Jonathan Winters' "Maude Frickert" character, and she had her own variation on her son's Proton Energy Pills, "Ma Ramjet's Atomic Vitamins for Old People whose Get-Up-and-Go Got Up and Left."

Lance Crossfire (a parody of actor Burt Lancaster; the name may have been a pun on real life test pilot Scott Crossfield), Ramjet's toothy test pilot rival for the affections of his short, Southern-accented sweetheart Lotta Love, is also likely to get in the way. When Lance and Roger cross paths, neither one of them wins: in one episode, the always-fickle Lotta ends up dating General Brassbottom, who promises the two men that he will take care of her.  As is his way, Roger does not realize that they have both lost — unlike Lance, who inevitably ends these cartoons with the phrase, "Oh, Roger — Shut up!"

Episodes

Season one (1965)
 "Dr. Ivan Evilkisser"
 "The Sheik"
 "Bat Guy"
 "The Shaft"
 "Kokomo"
 "Baseball"
 "The Cowboy"
 "Dee Kidnap"
 "Drafted"
 "TV Crisis"
 "Miss America"
 "The Pirates"
 "Revolution"
 "Torture"
 "The Race"
 "Jack the Nipper"
 "Ma Ramjet"
 "The Cockroaches" - this episode is a parody of The Beatles
 "Moon"
 "Hi Noon"
 "Bank Robbers"
 "Sun Clouds"
 "Football"
 "Bullfighter"
 "Bathysphere"
 "Skydiving"
 "Monkey"
 "Dr. Frank N. Schwine"
 "The Martins and the Coys" 
 "Planets"
 "Orbit"
 "Tennis"

Season two (1966)
 "Werewolf"
 "Flying Saucers"
 "Skateboards"
 "Scotland Yard"
 "Long Joan Silver"
 "Moonshot"
 "Treasure in Sierra's Mattress"
 "Tarzap"
 "Comics"
 "Jet Boots"
 "Little Roger"
 "Cycles"
 "Air Devil"
 "Spy in the Sky"
 "Hollywood"
 "Track Meet"
 "Surf Nuts"
 "Dry Dock"
 "Machines"
 "Coffee"
 "Stolen"
 "Assassins"
 "Genie"
 "Airplane"
 "Woodsman"
 "K.O. at the Gun Fight Corral" 
 "Mars"
 "Puck"
 "Pirate Gold"
 "Fox"
 "Super Mother"
 "Dr. What"

Season three (1967)
 "Party"
 "Large Leslie"
 "Gamey"
 "Time Machine"
 "Horse"
 "Pool"
 "Ancestors"
 "Hoop-dee-Doo"
 "Big Woof"
 "Robot Plants"
 "Robot Plot"
 "Turkey"
 "Fishing"
 "Purloined Pinky"
 "Snow"
 "Ripley"
 "Monster Masquerade" 
 "Lompoc Diamond"
 "School"
 "Vaudeville"
 "Coffee House"
 "Pirate Games"
 "Horse Race"
 "Missing"
 "Dentist"
 "Rip Van Ramjet"
 "Desert Ox"
 "Ad Game"
 "Lotsa Pizza"
 "Land Rush"
 "Show Business"
 "The Catnapper"

Season four (1968)
 "Opera Phantom"
 "Pies"
 "Small World"
 "Cousin"
 "Doodle League"
 "Ark"
 "Sauce"
 "Whale"
 "For the Birds"
 "Abominable Snowman"
 "Hero Training"
 "Lompoc Cannonball"
 "Safari"
 "Tiger"
 "Rodeo"
 "Dumb Waiter"
 "Blast Off"
 "Twas the Night Before"
 "Portrait of Roger"
 "Prince and the Doodle"
 "Water Sucker"
 "Volcano"
 "Limberlost"
 "General Kidnap"
 "Drought"
 "How's Your Pass?"
 "Rabbit Man"
 "Pill Caper"
 "Three Faces of Roger"
 "Private Eye"
 "Espionage Express"
 "Winfield of the Infield"

Season five (1969)
 "Branch Office"
 "Wedding Bells"
 "Bunny"
 "Hypnochick"
 "Doctor"
 "Jolly Rancher"
 "Little Monster"
 "Flying Town"
 "Daring Young Man"
 "Crown Jewels"
 "April Fool"
 "Dry Sea"
 "Pay Cut"
 "Killer Doodle"
 "Polar Bear"
 "Ruggers"
 "Nut"
 "The Law"
 "Hassenfeffer"
 "Manhole"
 "Blockbuster"
 "Sellout"
 "Scout Outing"
 "Love"
 "Decorator"
 "Lompoc Lizards"
 "Blunderosa"
 "General Doodle"

Cast and crew
 Gary Owens – Roger Ramjet
 David Ketchum – Narrator
 Bob Arbogast – General G. I. Brassbottom, Ma Ramjet, additional voices
 Dick Beals – Yank and Dan of the American Eagles
 Gene Moss – Doodle of the American Eagles, Noodles Romanoff
 Joan Gerber – Dee of the American Eagles, Lotta Love, Jacqueline Hyde
 Paul Shively – Lance Crossfire, Red Dog the Pirate
 Jim Thurman – additional voices
 Ken Snyder – additional voices
Gene Moss and Jim Thurman were the writers of the series.
Paul Shively wrote the lyrics for the show's theme song.

Airdates
Roger Ramjet first aired on NBC in 1965, and later on Cartoon Network in the mid-1990s. The show was also on the BBC and ITV from 1979 to 1994 in the UK and Europe wide on Sky Channel from 1985 to 1989 and Bravo from 1992 to 1993. In Australia, the show is aired on the ABC in 1966 in the afternoon and had been airing up until 2003. Selected Minisodes of the show are available to stream free on Sony's Crackle. The series was also screened in several other countries including ZNBC in Zambia, Dubai 33 in the U.A.E., SABC1 in South Africa, KBC in Kenya and NZBC, South Pacific Television, TV One and TV2 in New Zealand.

In 2017, the show aired on KTV in the United States and was taken off in 2019. After The 2022 Philippines Elections, the show aired on PTV.

Production notes
The creators of the series were from Lompoc, California and worked in many references to the town into the series, including setting several episodes there. Invariably, the name of the town was mispronounced.
The name "Roger" came about after producer Fred Crippen had an interview with a reporter named Roger Smith. Smith asked Crippen about his new TV show and then joked that the main character should be named Roger.
The theme song's lyrics are sung to the melody of "Yankee Doodle".
 Many of the production personnel would go on to be involved with Sesame Workshop after Roger Ramjet's run.

Other credits
 Associate Producers: Dick Reed, Paul Shively
 Production Coordinator: Fred Calvert
 Animation: Don Schloat, Alan Zaslove, Bill Hutton, George Nicholas, Fred Crippen
 Background: Jack Heiter
 Layout: Rosemary O'Connor, Sam Weiss, Joe Bruno, Dave Hanan, Bob Kurtz
 Sound Effects: Phil Kaye
 Ink and Paint: Constance Crawley
 Checking: Dottie Mullens
 Sound: TV Recorders, Western Recorders

DVD release
On February 8, 2005, Classic Media (distributed by Sony Wonder) released Roger Ramjet: Hero Of Our Nation (Special Collector's Edition), a 3-disc box set containing 119 of the 156 episodes of the series (although the box incorrectly states that 120 episodes are included). Another company, Image Entertainment, previously issued two single DVDs (Roger Ramjet: Hero Of Our Nation and Roger Ramjet: Man Of Adventure), each including 15 cartoons not featured in the three-disc set. This leaves seven cartoons unreleased on DVD (as of November 2007): #36 (Scotland Yard), #125 (Bunny), #128 (Jolly Rancher), #152 (Air Devil), #154 (Dry Dock), #155 (Machines), and #156 (Stolen).

Soundtrack
RCA Victor released a soundtrack album in 1966.

See also
 Dudley Do-Right
 The Flintstones
 The Jetsons

References

External links

 
 RogerRamjet.com-The Official Site of Roger Ramjet
 Roger Ramjet Intro YouTube

1960s American animated television series
1965 American television series debuts
1969 American television series endings
American superhero comedy television series
American children's animated comedy television series
American children's animated superhero television series
Australian Broadcasting Corporation original programming
Aviation television series
Aviation comics
Television series by Universal Television
DreamWorks Classics
Ramjet, Roger
Ramjet, Roger
United States-themed superheroes